"Psycho" is a song by British singer-songwriter Maisie Peters, released on 1 July 2021 through Gingerbread Man Records as the second single from her debut studio album You Signed Up for This.

Reception
The song has received praise for its "smarter" and light-hearted approach of the term "psycho"; this is in stark contrast to Ava Max's 2018 song "Sweet but Psycho" which attracted criticism from several mental health advocates for stigmatizing mental illnesses.

Credits and personnel
Credits adapted from Tidal

Maisie Peters – vocals, songwriting
Steve Mac – songwriting, production, keyboards
Ed Sheeran – songwriting, additional backing vocals
Chris Laws – engineering, drums
Tim Laws – electric guitar
Dan Pursey – engineering
Stuart Hawkes – mastering
Mark "Spike" Stent – mixing
Matt Wolach – mixing assistance

Charts

Release history

References

2021 singles
2021 songs
Maisie Peters songs
Gingerbread Man Records singles
Song recordings produced by Steve Mac
Songs about mental health
Songs written by Ed Sheeran
Songs written by Maisie Peters
Songs written by Steve Mac